Ranjon Ghoshal (7 June 1955 – 9 July 2020) was an Indian theatre director and musician. He was a member of the Bengali band Moheener Ghoraguli, and ran an advertising agency, Mareech Advertising in Bangalore, apart from Forum Three, a theatre group.

Biography
He was born in a small town named  Memari, District: Burdwan, West Bengal to Leela (born: 1925) and late Tarapada Ghoshal (1915 - 16 February 2008), both from Barishal (district) now in Bangladesh. Tarapada retired from a Govt. of India's political intelligence bureau posting equivalent of an additional Superintendent of Police in 1973. Leela has always been a homemaker. Ranjon has three elder brothers, Tapan (born:1945), Swapan (born: 1947) and  Chandan (born: 1950), one sister, Mala (born: 1957) and a younger brother, Kanchan (born: 1960).

On 27 April 1980, Ranjon was married to Sangeeta (née Ghosh).

A first cousin of Gautam Chattopadhyay, who founded arguably Bengal's and India's first band in 1975 along with himself and other members; Ranjon was the presenter of the band and also contributed to the lyrics. He used to handle all the media interaction and cover designing.

An electrical engineer from Jadavpur University and PGD in Industrial Management, NITIE, Mumbai, Ranjon has worked with BHEL for a few years before becoming a designer-entrepreneur. He resided in Bangalore, India with his wife Sangeeta and two sons, Indrayudh and Abhimanyu. Ranjon hosted various Bengali celebrities at his home in Bangalore which was also known as Yellow Submarine.

He was an active member of the Bangalore theatre scene, directing and performing plays in English with the group Forum Three.

Ranjon, as a part of his effort in keeping alive the spirit of Moheen songs, had organized the First Rock Concert in Bangalore and Abar Bochhor Tirish Pore in Kolkata. He had started grooming brands under a venture named 'Mind It!'.

Ghoshal died on July 9, 2020, at the age of 65.

Discography

Moheener Ghoraguli albums

Shangbigno Pakhikul O Kolkata Bishayak (1977)
Ajaana UDonto bostu ba Aw-Oo-Baw (1978)
Drishyomaan Moheener Ghoraguli (1979)

Plays

Scandals
In October 2019, there were allegations of sexual harassment against Ranjon Ghoshal. Though he had initially dismissed the allegations, he finally extended a public apology for his behavior, following social media outrage. Gaurab Chatterjee, son of Moheener Ghoraguli leader Goutam Chatterjee, said "Ranjon Ghoshal is not synonymous with Moheener Ghoraguli" after these incidents. An original member of the band, Tapas Bapi Das, also did the same.

References

External links

 Crisis of Civilization - A Journey with Tagore
 Mareech Advertising, team
 Forum Three, website
 Moheener Ghoraguli homepage

1955 births
2020 deaths
Bengali musicians
Moheener Ghoraguli members
Jadavpur University alumni
Indian theatre directors
Indian male musicians
Musicians from West Bengal